Charles Deenen (born 15 January 1970 in Holthees), is a Dutch computer/video game audio director, music composer, sound designer, and mixer. He is also known for his music and sound efforts for games of the C64 and Amiga era. He was one of the first demosceners.

Early career
His first sound achievement was the self-written sound driver for Commodore PET, which he wrote at the age of 13. In the early 1980s he bought a C64. He often wrote graphical and musical demos on it and showed demos at game exhibitions, and through his hobby he met fellow composer Jeroen Tel. In 1987 he, with Tel and some others, started the sound and music group Maniacs of Noise and composed game music for platforms such as the Commodore 64, Commodore Amiga and Atari ST, being hired by such companies as Sega, U.S. Gold and Probe Software. Initially he was strictly a programmer for the group, working on audio drivers and sound effects while leaving all the actual composing to Tel, but after their first few games he began working on music as well. With Maniacs of Noise he composed Double Dragon, home computer versions of Soldier of Light, and Jukka Tapanimäki's game Zamzara. In all, Maniacs of Noise composed the music for over 300 Commodore 64 and Amiga games.

Virgin, Interplay, Shiny and EA
In 1990 he moved to the US and worked for Virgin Games for 6 months. In 1991 his talent was noted by Interplay (with which he worked on Dragon Wars) and they recruited him as a composer/sound designer. The most famous projects he worked on with Interplay were Fallout 1 and 2, Another World, Planescape: Torment, The Lost Vikings and Descent 2. In 2002 he left Interplay and briefly worked for Shiny on Enter the Matrix. In 2003, Deenen moved to Canada and joined EA as senior audio director, working primarily on the Need for Speed series. In 2013 he left EA and started working as a freelancer for the industry.

Other work
Aside from video games, Deenen also works on sound for films. He provides world-wide lectures about sound in video games, films and trailers as of 2006. He is also a professional photographer, having many collections of works on his own site.

Personal life
Deenen lives in Tarzana with his wife Ana and dog Speely.

References

External links
Designing Sound interview
MobyGames information page
Composer profile at OverClocked ReMix
Charles Deenen at Commodore 64 Scene Database
Car sounds recording: Guide by Charles Deenen. February 25, 2010.

1970 births
Living people
Commodore 64 music
Dutch composers
Video game composers
People from Boxmeer